The Mad Hatter is the eleventh album by Chick Corea. Released in 1978, it is a concept album inspired by Lewis Carroll's 1865 novel Alice's Adventures in Wonderland.

Track listing 
All tracks composed by Chick Corea. "Falling Alice" and "Dear Alice" include additional lyrics by Gayle Moran.

Personnel 
 Chick Corea – acoustic piano (A1–B3); Fender Rhodes electric piano (A6); ARP Odyssey, Minimoog, Polymoog, Moog Model 15 modular, Moog Sample & Hold, Oberheim 8-voice synthesizers (A1, A6); MXR Digital Delay, Eventide Harmonizer (A1); marimba (A1, B2); finger cymbals (A5, B2); African shaker, cowbell, arrangements, producer
 Joe Farrell – tenor saxophone (A4, A6); flute (A3, A5, A6, B2, B3), concert flute (B2)
 Herbie Hancock – Fender Rhodes electric piano ((B3))
 Jamie Faunt – double bass (A3, A5, B1)
 Eddie Gómez – double bass (A4, A6, B2, B3)
 Steve Gadd – drums (A4, A6, B2, B3)
 Harvey Mason – drums (A3, A5)
 Gayle Moran – vocals (A3, A6, B1–B3)

Brass:
 Stewart Blumberg – trumpet (A3, A5, A6, B2, B3)
 John Rosenburg – trumpet (A3, A5, A6, B2, B3)
 John Thomas – trumpet (A5, A6, B2, B3)
 Ron Moss – trombone (A3, A5, A6, B3)

Strings:
 Charles Veal – violin (A2, A3, A5, A6, B1–B3)
 Kenneth Yerke – violin (A2, A3, A5, A6, B1–B3)
 Denyse Buffum – viola (A2, A3, A5, A6, B1, B2)
 Michael Nowack – viola (B3)
 Dennis Karmazyn – cello (A2, A3, A5, A6, B1–B3)

Charts

References

External links 
 

1978 albums
Chick Corea albums
Concept albums
Music based on Alice in Wonderland
Polydor Records albums